Chinese names in space

Moon 
 Cai Lun (crater)
 Bi Sheng (crater)
 Zhang Yuzhe (crater)

Mercury 
 Chao Meng-Fu (crater)

Venus 
 Ban Zhao crater

Mars 
 Cangwu crater
 Daan
 Dunhuang
 Hsūanch'eng
 Kalpin
 Linpu
 Liu Hsin (crater)
 Pinglo
 Soochow
 Suzhi (crater)
 Xainza
 Zhigou

Asteroids 
 2425 Shenzhen

951 Gaspra 
 Tang-Shan crater

Exoplanets 
 Wangshu

See also 
 Chinese star names

External links 
 "Three moon craters named after Chinese scientists," China.org

Space program of the People's Republic of China
Astronomical nomenclature by nation